The Parish Church of Saint Matthew, Langford is the Church of England parish church of Langford, a village in West Oxfordshire about  northeast of Lechlade in neighbouring Gloucestershire.

Government
The church was established as a chapelry of the Anglo-Saxon minster of St. Mary's, Bampton. Later in the Anglo-Saxon era Langford was elevated to a minster with its own dependent chapels at Grafton and Radcot. Both chapels are long gone, but Grafton and Radcot hamlets remain parts of Langford's ecclesiastical parish.

Langford was part of the Diocese of Lincoln until the Diocese of Oxford was established under Henry VIII in 1541. Despite becoming part of the new diocese, Langford remained a prebend of Lincoln Cathedral until 1848, when the Ecclesiastical Commissioners Act 1840 ceded all prebendal estates in England to the Ecclesiastical Commissioners.

The church at Langford was formerly dedicated to St. Mary. It was later rededicated to its current patron, St. Matthew.

The parish is now part of the Benefice of Shill Valley and Broadshire, which includes also the parishes of Alvescot, Black Bourton, Broadwell, Broughton Poggs, Filkins, Holwell, Kelmscott, Kencot, Little Faringdon, Shilton and Westwell.

Anglo-Saxon building

The oldest parts of the present church at Langford are the bell tower and nave, which were built in the second half of the 11th century. They may post-date the Norman conquest of England, but they are very high quality work by Anglo-Saxon masons and are the most important Anglo-Saxon remains in Oxfordshire.

The north and south aisles were added in about 1200 and the south porch in the 13th century, all in the Early English Gothic style. The west walls of the nave and two aisles each have a 13th-century lancet window. At one time the porch had two storeys. The upper storey has since been removed, but its blocked doorway and the outline of its stairs are still visible inside the south aisle.

The porch includes two Anglo-Saxon stone rood reliefs, but they are repositioned and their original sites are not known. The one on the east wall of the porch is 8th century and has lost its head. The one on the south gable of the porch is 10th century and has been assembled with Christ's left and right arms swapped over and the figures of Saint Mary and Saint John the Evangelist also transposed.

Later additions
In the 13th century the chancel was rebuilt wider and taller. The line of the former 11th century Anglo-Saxon roof against the east wall of the tower can be seen at the west end of the chancel. The concave lozenge at the top of each of the chancel windows is a highly unusual feature for the 13th century. The elaborate aumbry in the north wall of the chancel, with six compartments under three gables, is also unusual and suggests that it was a rich parish at the time.

Most of the windows of the north wall of the north aisle and south wall of the south aisle are 14th or 15th century Decorated Gothic or Perpendicular Gothic additions. The present font is 15th century.

In 1574 two flying buttresses were added to the north side of the north aisle. The more westerly of the two bears an inscription giving the date in the reign of Elizabeth I. A pair of tall, cylindrical pinnacles at the west end of the nave, surmounting the late Norman pilaster buttresses on the west gable wall, were also added in the 16th century.

The pulpit is Jacobean, made in 1673. A clock was installed in the latter part of the 17th century but is now a static exhibit in the south aisle.

Restoration and conservation
The architect and builder Richard Pace restored the building in 1829. Further repairs were recommended by the Ecclesiastical Commissioners' surveyor Benjamin Ferrey in 1848 and undertaken the following year. The Gothic Revival architect Ewan Christian restored the nave roof to its original pitch in 1864.

St. Matthew's is now a Grade I listed building.

Bells
The tower has a ring of six bells. Four were cast in 1741 by Henry III Bagley of Chacombe, Northamptonshire, who at the time had a bell-foundry at Witney. The tenor and treble bells were cast by the Whitechapel Bell Foundry in 1953.

Gallery

References

Sources

External links 
 360° Panorama of Church interiors

Anglo-Saxon art
Church of England church buildings in Oxfordshire
Grade I listed churches in Oxfordshire
Standing Anglo-Saxon churches